Ram Niwas is an Indian politician. He was elected to the Haryana Legislative Assembly from Narwana in the 2019 Haryana Legislative Assembly election as a member of the Jannayak Janta Party.

References

Living people
Jannayak Janta Party politicians
Indian National Lok Dal politicians
People from Jind district
Haryana MLAs 2019–2024
Year of birth missing (living people)